Aribi is the last name of:

 Salim Aribi (born 1974), Algerian football player
 Rayan Aribi (born 1987), Tunisian handball player

Aribi also stands for:
 a district of the Local Government District of Kagarko, Nigeria
 one of several names for proto-Arabic tribes in ancient times, compare Arab (etymology)